The 1999 Toronto Argonauts finished in 3rd place in the East Division of the 1999 CFL season with a 9–9 record and lost the East Division Semi-Finals.

Offseason

CFL draft

Preseason

Regular season

Season standings

Regular season

 † Canadian Football Hall of Fame Game

Postseason

Awards and records
Pinball Clemons, 1999 Tom Pate Award

1999 CFL All-Stars
DT – Demetrious Maxie
LB – Mike O'Shea
CB – Adrion Smith
P – Noel Prefontaine

Eastern Division All-Star Selections
DT – Demetrious Maxie
LB – Mike O'Shea
CB – Adrion Smith
P – Noel Prefontaine

References

External links

Toronto Argonauts seasons